Arpaise is a comune (municipality) in the Province of Benevento in the Italian region Campania, located about 50 km northeast of Naples and about 11 km south of Benevento.  
  
Arpaise borders the following municipalities: Altavilla Irpina, Ceppaloni, Pietrastornina, Roccabascerana.

References

Cities and towns in Campania
Articles which contain graphical timelines